Caziot is a French surname. Notable people with the surname include:

 Pierre Caziot (1876–1953), French agricultural engineer and politician
 (Commandant)  (1844–1931), French malacologist

French-language surnames